Healy is an unincorporated community in Lane County, Kansas, United States.  As of the 2020 census, the population of the community and nearby areas was 195.

History
Healy originated as a station and shipping point on the Missouri Pacific Railroad. The first post office in Healy was established in 1887.

Geography

Climate
According to the Köppen Climate Classification system, Healy has a semi-arid climate, abbreviated "BSk" on climate maps.

Demographics

For statistical purposes, the United States Census Bureau has defined Healy as a census-designated place (CDP), which includes population from the surrounding area.

Economy
Sharp Brothers Seed Company is a family-owned seed company that has been in business in Healy since 1958. It currently has about 60 employees in Healy.

Education
The community is served by Healy USD 468 public school district.  Their mascot is "The Eagles", and offer volleyball, basketball and track, collaborating with Ransom, KS. Since the 2012-2013 season, the Healy High School basketball team holds a record of 5-97, and according to MaxPreps, is ranked as the second worst team in the state of Kansas, just ahead of the Kansas School for the Deaf in Olathe, as of the end of the 2015-2016 season.

As of the 2022-2023 school year, Healy is the smallest public school in the state of Kansas, with an enrollment of 23 K-12 students, and only 10 high school students.

Notable people
 Harold Ensley, radio and television personality best known for his television program The Sportsman's Friend

References

Further reading

External links
 USD 468, local school district
 Lane County maps: Current, Historic, KDOT

Census-designated places in Lane County, Kansas
Census-designated places in Kansas